Neo Fascio is the second album by Japanese singer Kyosuke Himuro.

Track listing
Overture
Neo Fascio
Escape
Charisma
Cool
Summer Game
Rhapsody in Red
Misty
Camouflage
Calling
Love Song

Singles
Summer Game — #1
Misty — #2

Kyosuke Himuro albums
1989 albums